Keith Kelly may refer to:

Keith Kelly (footballer) (born 1983), Jamaican football player
Keith Kelly (singer), 1950s–1960s English pop singer, guitarist and songwriter
Keith Kelly (Canadian football) for Toronto Argonauts
Keith Kelly (Gaelic footballer)
Keith Kelly (athlete) in 2001 IAAF World Cross Country Championships – Senior men's race